Kenneth William Sutton (born November 5, 1969) is a Canadian former professional ice hockey player. Sutton played defence in the National Hockey League (NHL) for the Buffalo Sabres, Edmonton Oilers, St. Louis Blues, New Jersey Devils, San Jose Sharks and New York Islanders.

Playing career

Junior career
Born in Edmonton, Alberta, Ken Sutton played one season for the Saskatoon Blades in 1988–89 helping the team to the Memorial Cup final.

Professional career
He began his career with the Rochester Americans of the American Hockey League (AHL) where he would play for two seasons before being called up to the Buffalo Sabres in 1991. He stayed with Buffalo until he was traded to the Edmonton Oilers for Scott Pearson on April 7, 1995.

Sutton played parts of two seasons for Edmonton in between stints with the Worcester IceCats. He was traded to the St. Louis Blues along with Igor Kravchuk for Jeff Norton and Donald Dufresne on January 4, 1996. He only played a total of seven games for the Blues spending the rest of the season with the IceCats.

Sutton was traded to the New Jersey Devils with St. Louis' second-round choice (Brett Clouthier) in the 1999 NHL Entry Draft for Mike Peluso and Ricard Persson on November 26, 1996. Sutton would spend the entire 1997 in the minors between the Manitoba Moose of the International Hockey League (IHL) and the AHL's Albany River Rats.

Sutton played 13 games for New Jersey in the 1997–98 season before being traded to the San Jose Sharks with John MacLean for Doug Bodger and Dody Wood on December 7, 1997. He only played eight games for San Jose before being sent back to New Jersey on August 26, 1998 for future considerations. Sutton played the next season for the Albany River Rats. Sutton was claimed by the Washington Capitals in the Waiver Draft on September 27, 1999 before being sent back to New Jersey for future considerations on October 5. Sutton again played the majority of the season in Albany before being called up to the Devils for the playoffs. He would help New Jersey win the Stanley Cup in 2000. Sutton's name was included on the Stanley Cup in 2000 even though he did not qualify as he had played only six regular season games, and did not dress in the playoffs. Sutton played the next season for the Devils, this time playing in the 2001 Stanley Cup Finals where the Devils lost to the Colorado Avalanche in seven games.

Sutton signed as a free agent with the New York Islanders on July 5, 2001. He split the 2001–02 season between the NHL and the Bridgeport Sound Tigers of the AHL. Sutton went back to the Devils for the 2002–03 season playing the whole year for the Albany River Rats. After 2003, he left the NHL and went to play in Europe.

Europe
From 2003–2006, Sutton played for ERC Ingolstadt of the DEL.

Awards and achievements
1999 Eddie Shore Award (AHL Best Defenceman)

Career statistics

External links

Picture of Ken Sutton's Name on the 2000 Stanley Cup Plaque

1969 births
Living people
Albany River Rats players
Bridgeport Sound Tigers players
Buffalo Sabres draft picks
Buffalo Sabres players
Calgary Canucks players
Canadian ice hockey defencemen
Edmonton Oilers players
ERC Ingolstadt players
Ice hockey people from Edmonton
Manitoba Moose (IHL) players
New Jersey Devils players
New York Islanders players
Rochester Americans players
St. Louis Blues players
San Jose Sharks players
Saskatoon Blades players
Worcester IceCats players
Stanley Cup champions
Canadian expatriate ice hockey players in Germany